Bartle Frere is a locality in the Cairns Region, Queensland, Australia.

Geography 

The locality of Bartle Frere lies to the south of Mount Bartle Frere. The locality is flat low-lying land (10–20 metres above sea level) and is freehold land used for farming, predominantly the growing of sugarcane. The Russell River forms the boundary to the locality to the south and east.

The Bruce Highway forms the northern boundary of the locality with the North Coast railway line immediately parallel and adjacent to the north (so just outside the boundary of the locality in neighbouring Eubenangee).

History 

The locality takes its name from Mount Bartle Frere, which in turn was named after Sir Henry Bartle Frere, the president of the Royal Geographical Society, by explorer George Elphinstone Dalrymple on 30 September 1873.

Bartle Frere State School opened on 30 January 1922.

In the 2011 census, Bartle Frere had a population of 361 people.

Education 
Bartle Frere State School is a co-educational government primary school (P-6) at 29 Price Road. In 2016, the school had an enrolment of 8 students with 2 teachers (1 full-time equivalent) and 4 non-teaching staff (2 full-time equivalent).

References

Further reading

External links 

Cairns Region
Localities in Queensland